Bid Kabgan may refer to:
 Bid-e Kabkan
 Bid Kard Gam